Basardilla is a municipality located in the province of Segovia, Castile and León, Spain. The town's name has a Roman origin and means "Zarza Valley". It is located between Torrecaballeros and Brieva at an altitude of 1010 meters. According to the 2004 census (INE), the municipality had a population of 149 inhabitants.

References

Municipalities in the Province of Segovia